Barkanovskaya is a rural locality (a village) in Beketovskoye Rural Settlement, Vozhegodsky District, Vologda Oblast, Russia. The population was 10 as of 2002.

Geography 
Barkanovskaya is located 72 km northwest of Vozhega (the district's administrative centre) by road. Semyonovskaya is the nearest rural locality.

References 

Rural localities in Vozhegodsky District